Ayatollah Mousavi Hospital is a public hospital located in Zanjan and currently has a capacity of 320 beds.

References

External links
Location of Ayatollah Mousavi Hospital

Hospitals in Iran